

References

D